Nikolai Vladimirovich Poyarkov (born 16 October 1999) is a Russian football player who plays as a left-back for FC Rostov.

Club career
He made his debut in the Russian Professional Football League for FC Lokomotiv-Kazanka Moscow on 19 July 2017 in a game against FC Znamya Truda Orekhovo-Zuyevo.

On 2 September 2019, he signed with FC Rostov and was immediately loaned to FC Rubin Kazan.

He made his Russian Premier League debut for Rubin on 25 October 2019 in a game against FC Ural Yekaterinburg. He started the game and played the whole match.

International
He played for the Russia national under-18 football team.

Career statistics

References

External links
 
 
 

1999 births
People from Yefremovsky District
Living people
Russian footballers
Association football defenders
Russia youth international footballers
FC Lokomotiv Moscow players
FC Rubin Kazan players
FC Rostov players
Russian Premier League players
Russian Second League players
Sportspeople from Tula Oblast